Orlando Brown may refer to:
Orlando Brown (Kentucky politician) (1801–1867), American newspaper editor, historian and politician
Orlando Brown (Wisconsin politician) (1828–1910), American farmer and legislator
Orlando Brown (American football) (1970–2011), American football player
Orlando Brown (actor) (born 1987), American actor and rapper
Orlando Brown Jr. (born 1996), American football player